Ervin J. Rokke (born December 12, 1939) is a retired lieutenant general and retired President of Moravian College. He is a retired United States Air Force lieutenant general and former president of the National Defense University.  During the 1980's, as a Brigadier General in the United States Air Force, General Rokke served as the Dean of Faculty at the United States Air Force Academy.

Ervin Rokke completed his time at Moravian in the summer of 2006. At the commencement ceremonies that year, he received an honorary doctorate from the college. Mrs. Priscilla Payne Hurd, Chair of the Moravian Board of Trustees, observed that “Erv Rokke has been one of Moravian’s finest and most successful presidents. Even by the standards of an institution that has existed for 264 years, his leadership, his integrity, and his achievement are extraordinary. By a huge measure, he has raised the quality of our students and programs, he has raised new buildings on our campuses, and he has raised our hopes and ambitions for an even brighter future. For nine very good years, we have been blessed and honored by his leadership and by his friendship.”

Pamela Rokke was also honored for her extensive and steadfast support of College activities at every level, and most especially its students. Mrs. Hurd noted that “Pam Rokke is certainly one of the most gracious individuals who has lived in the president’s house. She is deeply admired by all members of our campus family: students, faculty, and administration alike.” For six years, Mrs. Rokke also served as an active member of the Board of Directors of New Bethany Ministries in Bethlehem.

Following retirement from Moravian, the Rokkes have relocated to Monument, Colorado.

References

External links
Biography page at Moravian College

Living people
United States Air Force Academy alumni
United States Air Force generals
1939 births
People from Warren, Minnesota
People from Monument, Colorado
Military personnel from Minnesota
Military personnel from Colorado